Twilla Ojukutu-Macauley (born 1967) is a Sierra Leonean model and beauty pageant titleholder who was crowned as the winner of the 1988 edition of the Miss Sierra Leone pageant.

Early life and education
Born into a Creole family in Freetown, Sierra Leone; Ojukutu-Macauley attended Freetown Secondary School for Girls and later worked as a receptionist for the Reliance Insurance Trust Corporation.

Pageantry

Miss Sierra Leone 1988
Whilst representing Western Area Urban District, Ojukutu-Macauley was crowned winner of the 1988 edition of Miss Sierra Leone that was held in Freetown. This result qualified her to represent her country at the Miss World 1988 pageant held on 17 November at the Royal Albert Hall in London, UK.

Miss World 1988
She represented Sierra Leone at the Miss World 1988 pageant but failed to place.

External links
Twilla Ojukutu-Macauley on Miss Sierra Leone 1988

References

Sierra Leone Creole people
People of Sierra Leone Creole descent
1967 births
Living people
Miss World 1988 delegates
Sierra Leonean beauty pageant winners
People from Freetown